This is a list of all airline codes. The table lists the IATA airline designators, the ICAO airline designators and the airline call signs (telephony designator). Historical assignments are also included for completeness.

Codes 

* on IATA code indicates a controlled duplicate.
italics indicates a defunct airline.

See also 
 International Air Transport Association airport code
 International Civil Aviation Organization airport code
 Iata has divided the world into 3 areas. These are also known as Traffic conference areas (TC-1 / TC-2 / TC-3)

References

External links 
International Civil Aviation Organization (official site)
Designators for Aircraft Operating Agencies, Aeronautical Authorities and Services (Doc8585) Publications Purchasing (official site)
 ICAO Aviation Data Service (official site)
Airline Designator / Code Database Search  (from The Airline Codes Web Site)
Airline Designator / Code Database Search (from Aviation Codes Central Web Site - Regular Updates)
Airline Designator / Code Listing (from FAA Web Site)
European Airline Designator / Code Database Search (Eurocontrol Web Site)

All